The 168th Infantry Regiment ("Third Iowa") is an infantry regiment of the United States Army. The 1st Battalion of the 168th Infantry is part of the 2nd Infantry Brigade Combat Team, 34th Infantry Division, part of the Iowa National Guard.

History

The 168th Infantry served during the 'Punitive Expedition' pursuing Pancho Villa and the latter part of World War I. It became part of the 42nd Division, commonly referred to as the 'Rainbow' Division. For four months, from July to November 1917, the unit built and occupied Camp Dodge in Johnston, Iowa. Prior to be being sent to Europe, the 168th was stationed at Camp Mills, New York.

First Battalion, 168th Infantry deployed to Afghanistan in 2004 where it provided provincial reconstruction team (PRT) security forces (SECFOR). The battalion was ordered again into active federal service on 31 July 2010 at home stations to deploy to Afghanistan in support of Operation Enduring Freedom (OEF).  The battalion conducted post mobilization training at Camp Shelby, MS from August to October 2010, culminating with a mission rehearsal exercise (MRX) at the National Training Center at Fort Irwin, CA.

Upon deployment into Afghanistan, 1st Battalion, 168th Infantry became Task Force 1-168 and assumed responsibility for the Afghan Province of Paktya.  Task Force 1-168's mission was conduct security force assistance through combined action with Afghan Security Forces that resided in Paktya.  Task Force 1-168 conducted a transfer of authority with Task Force 1-279 (Oklahoma Army National Guard) on 10 July 2011 and redeployed to the Continental United States (CONUS) in July 2011.

Lineage
During the Civil War the regiment was organized from independent companies in southwestern Iowa and mustered into federal service on 8 August 1861 as the 4th Regiment, Iowa Volunteer Infantry. It was reorganized on 1 January 1864 as the 4th Iowa Veteran Infantry Regiment, and mustered out of federal service 24 July 1865 at Louisville, Kentucky.

It was reorganized from 1868 to 1876 in Iowa as independent companies of volunteer militia, and these companies were consolidated on 18 February 1876 and 15 January 1877 to form the 3rd and 5th Infantry regiments, respectively. (The Iowa State Militia was redesignated on 3 April 1878 as the Iowa National Guard.)

The 3rd and 5th Infantry Regiments were consolidated 30 April 1892, and the consolidated unit was designated the 3rd Infantry Regiment.

On 30 May 1898, during the Spanish–American War, the regiment was mustered into federal service at Des Moines as the 51st Iowa Volunteer Infantry; and mustered out of federal service on 2 November 1899 at San Francisco, California.

It was reorganized on 26 March 1900 in the Iowa National Guard as the 51st Infantry Regiment with its headquarters at Des Moines. On 26 November 1902 it was redesignated as the 55th Infantry Regiment, and on 4 July 1915 was redesignated as the 3rd Infantry Regiment. It was mustered into federal service on 26 June 1916 at Camp Dodge, Iowa; and mustered out of federal service on 20 February 1917 at Des Moines.

After the United States entered World War I it was drafted into federal service again on 5 August 1917, reorganized and redesignated on 16 August 1917 as the 168th Infantry and assigned to the 42nd Division.

Demobilized on 17 May 1919 at Camp Dodge, Iowa, it was reorganized in 1920–1921 in the Iowa National Guard as the 168th Infantry and assigned to the 34th Division (later redesignated as the 34th Infantry Division). Federally recognized on 13 July 1921, its headquarters were at Des Moines. (Location of headquarters changed on 27 January 1937 to Council Bluffs).

Inducted during World War II into federal service 10 February 1941 at home stations, it was inactivated on 3 November 1945 at Camp Patrick Henry, Virginia.

Reorganized and federally recognized on 23 January 1947 with headquarters at Council Bluffs, it was reorganized on 1 May 1959 as a parent regiment under the Combat Arms Regimental System to consist of the 1st Battle Group, an element of the 34th Infantry Division.

Reorganized on 1 March 1963 to consist of the 1st Battle Group, and relieved from assignment to the 34th Infantry Division. Reorganized on 1 March 1964 to consist of the 1st and 2nd Battalions. Reorganized on 1 January 1968 to consist of the 1st Battalion, an element of the 47th Infantry Division. It was withdrawn on 1 May 1989 from the Combat Arms Regimental System and reorganized under the U.S. Army Regimental System. Reorganized 10 February 1991 to consist of the 1st Battalion, an element of the 34th Infantry Division.

Ordered into active federal service on 5 March 2004 at home stations; released from active federal service 1 September 2005 and reverted to state control.

Company D, 1st Battalion, 168 Infantry ordered into active federal service 4 June 2007 at Denison

Campaign participation credit

Civil War
Vicksburg
Chattanooga
Atlanta
Arkansas 1862
Alabama 1863
North Carolina 1865
South Carolina 1865
Philippine Insurrection
Manila
Malolos
World War I
Champagne-Marne
Aisne-Marne
St. Mihiel
Meuse-Argonne
Lorraine 1918
Champagne 1918

World War II
Algeria-French Morocco (with arrowhead)
Tunisia
Naples-Foggia
Operation Raincoat - First Battle of Monte Cassino
Anzio
Rome-Arno
North Apennines
Po Valley
War on Terrorism
Campaigns to be determined

Decorations
 French Croix de Guerre with Palm, World War II, Streamer embroidered BELVEDERE
 Presidential Unit Citation (Army), streamer embroidered MT PANTANO ITALY (1st Battalion, 168th Infantry Regiment, 29 November-3 December 1943, WD GO 86, 1944)
 Presidential Unit Citation (Army), streamer embroidered CERVARO ITALY (2nd Battalion, 168th Infantry Regiment, 6-13 January 1944, WD GO 6, 1945)

References

 The price of our heritage: in memory of the heroic dead of the 168 Infantry (PDF)

External links
 1st Battalion, 168 Infantry Facebook Page

Infantry regiments of the United States Army National Guard
168
Military units and formations established in 1861